Golnoush Sebghatollahi  (born 20 December 1990) is an Iranian sports shooter. She competed in the women's 10 metre air pistol event at the 2016 Summer Olympics. She failed to make the final.

References

External links
 

1990 births
Living people
Iranian female sport shooters
Olympic shooters of Iran
Shooters at the 2016 Summer Olympics
Sportspeople from Isfahan
Shooters at the 2018 Asian Games
Asian Games competitors for Iran
Islamic Solidarity Games competitors for Iran
Islamic Solidarity Games medalists in shooting
21st-century Iranian women